Kabala may refer to:

Kabbalah, a system of Jewish mysticism
Kabala, Sierra Leone, a town in Sierra Leone 
Kabala, Järva County, a village in Türi Parish, Järva County, Estonia
Kabala, Rapla County, a village in Rapla Parish, Rapla County, Estonia
Kabala, Mardin, a town in Mardin Province of Turkey
Ka-Bala, a 1967 fortune-telling board game
Prince Kabala, a character from the Speed Racer universe

See also 
Cabala (disambiguation)
Karbala, a city in Iraq
Kavala (disambiguation)